RSHS may refer to:
Schools in Australia
Redcliffe State High School, Redcliffe, Queensland
Robina State High School, Robina, Queensland
Rossmoyne Senior High School, Rossmoyne, Western Australia

Schools in Canada
Ross Sheppard High School, Edmonton, Alberta

Schools in the United States
John G. Rangos School of Health Sciences, a constituent college of Duquesne University in Pittsburgh, Pennsylvania
Reading Senior High School, Reading, Pennsylvania
Rich South High School, Richton Park, Illinois
Rock Springs High School, Rock Springs, Wyoming
Roosevelt Senior High School (Washington, D.C.)
Royal Sunset High School, Hayward, California

Schools in the Philippines
Regional Science High School (various campuses)